Cochlostoma salomoni is an extinct species of  land snail with an operculum, a terrestrial gastropod mollusk in the family Cochlostomatidae.

References

Diplommatinidae
Prehistoric gastropods